Diego Cunha Silveira (born February 20, 1987), best known as DH Silveira, is a Brazilian singer. He is known as the lead singer of the band Cine, and winner of the seventh season of the Brazilian version of The Farm.

Career
From 2007 to 2016, he was the lead singer of the pop rock band Cine.

A Fazenda 7
On September 14, 2014, the lead singer of Cine has been confirmed as one of the seventeen competitors of the seventh season of The Farm.

On December 10, 2014, after 90 days of confinement, he was crowned winner of the season, beating the model Babi Rossi and socialite Heloisa Faissol the final vote, taking the prize of 2 million reais home.

 Trivia
 He is the first and only finalist who won without passing by a vote of elimination.

References

External links
 DH Silveira at the R7.com
 

1987 births
21st-century Brazilian male singers
21st-century Brazilian singers
Brazilian pop singers
Living people
People from Jundiaí
Reality show winners
The Farm (TV series) winners